Jiang Ning (born 1 September 1986) is a Chinese professional footballer who plays for China League Two club Qingdao Hainiu as a striker and winger.

Club career
Ning began his football career when he joined Qingdao Jonoon's youth academy at the age of 11. He made his debut for the club during the 2004 season against Inter Shanghai on 16 May 2004, scoring a goal in a 2–2 draw. During the 2005 season, he was the team's top league scorer with six goals. During the 2006 season, he was again the club's top scorer with seven goals, including a hat-trick against Chongqing Lifan. During the 2009 season, Jiang's performances for Qingdao saw him receive interest from Russian Premier League side Spartak Moscow. On 20 July 2009, he would have a trial with Spartak Moscow, however the proposed transfer fell through after Spartak Moscow couldn't agree upon the 1,000,000 euro transfer fee which was requested by Qingdao. On 20 May 2010, Jiang suffered damage to his anterior cruciate ligament in a friendly match against Bayer Leverkusen while he was with the national team.

On 25 December 2010, Jiang, who was still recovering from injury, transferred to Guangzhou Evergrande for a reported 800,000 euros. On 9 April 2011, Jiang made his debut for the club against Nanchang Hengyuan in a 1–1 draw where he came on as a substitute for Zheng Zhi. This was followed by his first goal for the club against Shenzhen Ruby on 8 May 2011 in a 1–0 win. With Guangzhou, Jiang would be part of the squad that won the club's first ever top tier league title at the end of the 2011 season. During the 2012 season, the club signed Lucas Barrios which resulted in Jiang's playing time decreasing to 15 league games that season.

Along with his teammates Wu Pingfeng and Li Jianhua, Jiang transferred to fellow Chinese Super League side Guangzhou R&F in January 2013. He made his debut for the club against Liaoning Whowin on 9 March 2013 in a 4–2 loss. This was followed by his first goal for the club  against Dalian Aerbin on 25 May 2013 in a 3–2 win where Jiang went on to score a brace.

On 18 December 2015, Jiang transferred to Chinese Super League newcomer Hebei China Fortune. On 4 March 2016, he made his debut for Hebei in a 2–1 away win against Guangzhou R&F. He scored his first goal for the club on 30 April 2016, in a 2–0 victory against Liaoning Whowin.

International career
Jiang played for the Chinese under-23 national team at the 2007 Lunar New Year Cup and the 2007 Toulon Tournament in which China finished as runners-up in both tournaments. He made his senior international debut for the Chinese national team on 17 February 2008 during the 2008 East Asian Football Championship where China lost 3–2 against South Korea. He returned to the Chinese under-23 national team to play in the 2008 Summer Olympics where he participated in all three group games in the tournament as China was knocked out in the first round. After the tournament, Jiang returned to the senior team and he scored his first international goal against Vietnam on 21 January 2009 in a 6–1 win during 2011 AFC Asian Cup qualification.

Career statistics

International goals
As of match played 3 June 2016. China score listed first, score column indicates score after each Jiang Ning goal.

Honours

Club
Guangzhou Evergrande
Chinese Super League: 2011, 2012
Chinese FA Cup: 2012
Chinese FA Super Cup: 2012

International
China PR national football team
East Asian Football Championship: 2010

References

External links 
 
 
 
 

1986 births
Living people
Chinese footballers
Footballers from Qingdao
Olympic footballers of China
Footballers at the 2008 Summer Olympics
China international footballers
Qingdao Hainiu F.C. (1990) players
Guangzhou F.C. players
Guangzhou City F.C. players
Hebei F.C. players
Taizhou Yuanda F.C. players
Association football wingers
Chinese Super League players
China League Two players